Darren Ross Power is an Australian politician currently serving as the Mayor of the City of Logan. Prior to his election as mayor, Power served as Logan City Councillor for Division 10 from 1997 to 2019, and as Advocate for the City of Logan from 2019 to 2020. He is the father of professional gamers Lachlan Power and Mitchell Power who are from the esports team PWR.

Logan City Council
After serving as the Councillor for Division 10 for 22 years, Power and all other councillors for Logan City were terminated by the Queensland Government in May 2019 and a temporary administrator was appointed. The decision followed the Crime and Corruption Commission charging 8 of 12 sitting councillors with official corruption one week earlier. Mr Power and 3 other councillors gave evidence to the Crime and Corruption Commission prior to charges being laid, and were subsequently given official advisory positions by the temporary administrator.

Electoral history
Power was elected mayor of Logan on 28 March 2020, achieving 36.62% of the primary vote and placing first in a field of 8 candidates.

Although elected to the mayoralty as an independent candidate, Power had previously been a member of the Liberal National Party of Queensland, the National Party, and the Australian Labor Party respectively.

While the incumbent councillor for Logan City Council's Division 10, Power stood as the National Party candidate for Springwood in the 2001 Queensland state election, as an independent candidate for the Division of Rankin in the 2004 Australian federal election, and was the endorsed Liberal National candidate for Springwood at the 2009 Queensland state election, however resigned as a candidate to avoid having to resign his seat on council.

In 2010, Power announced his resignation from the Liberal National Party, citing the party's treatment of Beaudesert state MP and former party member Aidan McLindon.

References

Mayors of places in Queensland
Politicians from Brisbane
Living people
Year of birth missing (living people)